Fast Food is a 1989 American low budget comedy film starring Clark Brandon, Tracey Griffith, Jim Varney, Traci Lords, Michael J. Pollard, Blake Clark and Pamela Springsteen.

Plot
Auggie Hamilton (Clark Brandon) is always looking for ways to earn a quick buck. When he learns that his friend Samantha Brooks (Tracy Griffith) is going to sell her garage to fast food king Wrangler Bob Bundy (Jim Varney) he comes up with one more scheme, to turn the garage into a burger joint. When Wrangler Bob proves to be stiff competition, they develop a secret sauce that makes people go crazy.

It was shot in Atlanta and Los Angeles.

Cast

Clark Brandon as Auggie Hamilton
Randal Patrick as Drew Taylor
Tracy Griffith as Samantha Brooks
Michael J. Pollard as Bud
Lanny Horn as Calvin
Jim Varney as Bob Bundy
Blake Clark as E.G. McCormick
Traci Lords as Dixie Love
Pamela Springsteen as Mary Beth Bensen
Randi Layne as  Alexandra Lowell 
Kevin McCarthy as Judge Reinholte 
J. Don Ferguson as  Dean Witler 
Terry Hobbs as Donald Frump III 
Amy Bryson as Sheryl 
Kathleen Webster as Wendy 
Julie Ridley as Dr. Duran 
Paige Conner as Tracy 
Tom Key as Jack Skinner

References

External links
 
 

1989 films
American comedy films
1989 comedy films
American independent films
1989 independent films
1980s English-language films
1980s American films